Sphingopyxis ginsengisoli is a Gram-negative, aerobic, rod-shaped and motile bacterium from the genus of Sphingopyxis which has been isolated from soil from a ginseng field from Pocheon in Korea.

References

Sphingomonadales
Bacteria described in 2008